Cusset is a commune in the department of Allier, in central French region of Auvergne.

Population

Geography

Location 
Located on the Sichon River, tributary of the Allier river, in the foothills of the  Bourbonnaise Mountain, at an elevation of approximately 980 feet on top of the Mount Béton, Cusset is annexed to Vichy.

The city includes fifty or so Lieux-dit (part of a municipality nominated because of an historical particularity), the most important are Presle, Puy-Besseau, the Bartins, Champcourt, Chantegrelet, Chassignol and Viermeux.

Cusset is a part of the arrondissement of Vichy, for many years it was the capital of a unique canton until 1985, at which point a decree separated this canton into two parts : Northern Cusset and Southern Cusset. Following the boundary changes of 2014, only one canton shall remain in 2015.

The municipality is located, as the crow flies, at an equal distance between the administrative centers of the department of Moulins to the north and of the region of Clermont-Ferrand to the southeast (approx. 30 miles).

Geology and relief 
The surface area of the municipality 7890 acres, its elevation varies between 837 and 1584 feet. The low-lying areas are located near Vichy (built residences on the Sichon riverside) whereas the high-elevation sectors are located to the east (Chassignol, Meunière, Viermeux, Les Acarins)

Hydrography 
The Sichon passes through the municipality, tributary of the Allier river; the Bourbonnaise Mountain is the source of other waterways which cross the municipality ( le Jolan, le Rebusset, l’Abrion, le Dalbot).

Climate 
The climate in this region is continental. The climate records come from the nearest weather station located in Charmeil, close to the airport. In 2011 the city was exposed to the sun for a total of 88 days (2096 hours), these results are very close to the national average. The municipality registered a rainfall of  23 inches and the maximal speed of the wind reached 52 mph.

Culture 
Star Wars themed fan convention Générations Star Wars et Science Fiction occurs every year in the city's main auditorium Espace Chambon.

Twin towns — Sister cities
Cusset is twinned with:

 Neusäß, Germany

See also 
 Communes of the Allier department

External links 
 Town hall website (in French)

References 

Communes of Allier
Allier communes articles needing translation from French Wikipedia
Auvergne